This list of works by the French Post-Impressionist and Fauve painter of the l'École de Rouen (l'École de Rouen) Robert Antoine Pinchon is incomplete and consists mostly of oil paintings.

Pinchon was a prolific painter dedicated to painting en plein air. His artistic career spanned over forty years, from 1900 when he exhibited some of his first paintings at the age of 14, to his untimely death in 1943 at 56 years of age.

At the age of 19, Pinchon showed his works in Paris at the 1905 Salon d'Automne, an exhibition that witnessed the birth of Fauvism. Though Pinchon had not exhibited in room VII with the Fauves, his palette was already pure and his impasto thick.

Claude Monet referred to him as "a surprising touch in the service of a surprising eye ('étonnante patte au service d’un oeil surprenant')".



This list represents a selection of some of Robert Antoine Pinchon's better-known paintings, or includes those for which images are available. Rather than in chronological order, they are listed roughly in groups corresponding to themes: bridge scenes; flowers and gardens; harbors and boats; landscapes and fields; river scenes; towns; trees; winter scenes.

References

Pinchon
Pinchon, Robert Antoine